Amadeu Thiago de Mello (30 March 1926 – 14 January 2022), pen name Thiago de Mello, was a Brazilian poet, writer, translator, and environmental activist. He was among the most appreciated writers in the country and especially as an icon of Amazonian regional literature. His work has been translated into numerous languages.

Life and career 
After Thiago de Mello completed his elementary education at the Grupo Escolar Barão do Rio Branco and high school at the Gymnásio Pedro II in Manaus, he moved to Rio de Janeiro, where he enrolled in the Faculty of Medicine (Faculdade Nacional de Medicina), but left after four years to pursue the path of poetry. In 1951, Silêncio e Palavra, his first book, was published and immediately received critical acclaim.

During the military dictatorship from 1964 to 1985, he first took exile in Chile, where he found a friend and political sympathizer in Pablo Neruda and witnessed the violent overthrow of President Salvador Allende and the subsequent military coup.

In 1964, he wrote what is probably his best-known poem, Os Estatutos do Homem ( "The Statutes of Man"), which proclaimed simple human rights as a protest against the military regime and was allegedly immediately banned by it. His further exile took him to Argentina, Portugal, France, and Germany. After the end of the Brazilian military dictatorship, he moved back to his native city of Barreirinha, where he lived in a house owned by the architect Lúcio Costa and worked for the integrity of the Amazon region and for human rights.

During literary career, De Mello was awarded national and international prizes and awards.

Besides his own work, he had a long career as a translator of Latin American poetry by Pablo Neruda, César Vallejo, Ernesto Cardenal, Eliseo Diego, Nicolás Guillén, and also T. S. Eliot into Portuguese. His own works have appeared in Chile, Cuba, Argentina, Portugal, the United States, France, Great Britain and Germany, in addition to Brazil. Pablo Neruda said about him, "Thiago de Mello is a soul transformer," and dedicated the poem Thiago y Santiago to him.

De Mello died in Manaus on 14 January 2022, at the age of 95.

Awards 
 1960:  Brazilian Academy of Letters' Poetry award
 1962: Book of the Year Award by União Brasileira de Escritores
 1997:  Rio de Janeiro Book Biennial (Bienal do Livro do Rio de Janeiro) Award
 1997: Prêmio Jabuti for De uma vez por todas

In addition, Thiago de Mello was named Chevalier des Arts et des Lettres de France in the 1980s.

Works 
 1951: Silêncio e palavra
 1952: Narciso cego
 1956: A lenda da rosa
 1960: Vento geral
 1965: Faz escuro mas eu canto
 1966: A canção do amor armado
 1977: Os Estatutos do Homem
 1981: Mormaço na floresta
 1982: Horóscopo para os que estão vivos
 1986: Num campo de margaridas
 1991: Amazonas, pátria da àgua  Photographies by Luiz Cláudio Marigo
 1992: Os Estatutos do Homem e Poemas inéditos
 1993: Borges na luz de Borges
 1996: De uma vez por todas
 1999: Campo de milagres

References

External links 
 Thiago de Mello at Jornal de Poesia (in Portuguese and English)
 Antonio Miranda – Poesía Iberoamericana – Thiago de Mello (in Portuguese and Spanish)

1926 births
2022 deaths
20th-century Brazilian poets
21st-century Brazilian poets
21st-century Brazilian writers
Brazilian translators
Chevaliers of the Ordre des Arts et des Lettres
People from Amazonas (Brazilian state)